

113001–113100 

|-bgcolor=#f2f2f2
| colspan=4 align=center | 
|}

113101–113200 

|-bgcolor=#f2f2f2
| colspan=4 align=center | 
|}

113201–113300 

|-id=202
| 113202 Kisslászló ||  || László L. Kiss (born 1972), a Hungarian astronomer, a founding member of the Szeged Asteroid Program and a discoverer of minor planets. He is a long-time friend of astronomer Krisztián Sárneczky, who discovered this minor planet. || 
|-id=203
| 113203 Szabó ||  || Gyula M. Szabó  (born 1979), a Hungarian astronomer, a founding member of the Szeged Asteroid Program and a discoverer of minor planets || 
|-id=208
| 113208 Lea ||  || Lea Bernardi (born 2007), daughter of Italian astronomer Fabrizio Bernardi who discovered this minor planet. || 
|-id=214
| 113214 Vinkó ||  || József Vinkó (born 1965), a Hungarian astronomer and head of the Bright Supernova Observing Group at the University of Szeged || 
|-id=256
| 113256 Prüm ||  || The German town of Prüm, located in the Eifel region of western Germany || 
|}

113301–113400 

|-id=333
| 113333 Tyler ||  || David Bruce Valentine Tyler (born 1941), a British amateur astronomer and telescope maker who has assisted others through advice and creating accessories in his workshop. He is known for his solar observations and images. The British Astronomical Association awarded him its Merlin medal in 2012. || 
|-id=355
| 113355 Gessler ||  || Nick Gessler (born 1945), an American co-director of UCLA's Human Complex Systems Program, and prolific meteorite discoverer || 
|-id=388
| 113388 Davidmartinez ||  || David Martinez Delgado (born 1970) has searched and characterized the Sagittarius tidal stream and studied this satellite's interaction with our galaxy using theoretical simulations. He also discovered a tidal tail in the Ursa Minor satellite galaxy. || 
|-id=390
| 113390 Helvetia ||  || Helvetia is the Latin name for Switzerland, where this asteroid was discovered. Helvetia is also an allegorical figure, symbol for the nation. || 
|-id=394
| 113394 Niebur ||  || Susan Niebur (1978–2012), American astrophysicist and Discovery Program Scientist at NASA (Src) || 
|-id=395
| 113395 Curtniebur ||  || Curt Niebur (born 1972), American scientist responsible for NASA's New Frontiers program including the management of the program's first mission, New Horizons (Src) || 
|}

113401–113500 

|-id=405
| 113405 Itomori ||  || Itomori is a fictional Japanese town depicted in the anime movie Your Name that was destroyed by the impact of a comet fragment. || 
|-id=415
| 113415 Rauracia ||  || Rauracia, a group of Celts who settled in the Jura area of Switzerland around 400 B.C. and the name of the official anthem of the Swiss canton of Jura. This Hilda asteroid was the first unusual object discovered at the Jurassien-Vicques Observatory. || 
|-id=461
| 113461 McCay ||  || Winsor McCay (1869–1934) was an American illustrator and one of the first creators of animated films. His best-known works are the cartoon strips Dream of the Rarebit Fiend and Little Nemo in Slumberland, and the animated film Gertie the Dinosaur. In 1996, he was inducted into the Will Eisner Hall of Fame. || 
|}

113501–113600 

|-bgcolor=#f2f2f2
| colspan=4 align=center | 
|}

113601–113700 

|-id=659
| 113659 Faltona ||  || Faltona, an Italian village located in the Pratomagno mountain range of Tuscany || 
|-id=671
| 113671 Sacromonte ||  || Sacro Monte di Varese is a small mountain just north of the city of Varese, where fourteen chapels and a sanctuary were built between 1604 and 1623, dedicated to the mysteries of the Rosary. Since 2003, Sacro Monte is a UNESCO World Heritage site. || 
|}

113701–113800 

|-bgcolor=#f2f2f2
| colspan=4 align=center | 
|}

113801–113900 

|-bgcolor=#f2f2f2
| colspan=4 align=center | 
|}

113901–114000 

|-id=949
| 113949 Bahcall ||  || John N. Bahcall (1934–2005), an American astrophysicist || 
|-id=950
| 113950 Donbaldwin ||  || Donald R. Baldwin (1938–2003), was the co-founder and treasurer of the Astrophysical Research Consortium, important to the Sloan Digital Sky Survey || 
|-id=951
| 113951 Artdavidsen ||  || Arthur Davidsen (1944–2001), pioneer in the field of ultraviolet spectroscopy || 
|-id=952
| 113952 Schramm ||  || David Schramm (1945–1997), an American theoretical astrophysicist || 
|}

References 

113001-114000